Cabinet of Stanisław Mackiewicz (Polish: Rząd Stanisława Mackiewicza) was formed by the Polish Government in Exile on 8 June 1954, serving until 21 June 1955.

Original cabinet 
 Stanisław Mackiewicz, Prime Minister.
 Kazimierz Okulicz, Minister of Justice.
 Zygmunt Rusinek, Minister of Émigré Affairs.
 Stanisław Sopicki (Labor Party), Minister of the Treasury, Industry and Trade.

Changes 
 August 1954:
 Gen. Michał Karaszewicz-Tokarzewski became Minister of National Defense.
 Antoni Pająk (ZSP) became Minister of Congressional Works.

See also 
 Polish Government in Exile

Mackiewicz, Stanislaw
1954 establishments in Poland
1955 disestablishments in Poland
Cabinets established in 1954
Cabinets disestablished in 1955